In different periods of time and in different countries, the term majolica has been used for two distinct types of pottery.

Firstly, from the mid-15th century onwards, was maiolica, a type of pottery reaching Italy from Spain, Majorca and beyond. This was made by a tin-glaze process (dip, dry, paint, fire), resulting in an opaque white glazed surface decorated with brush-painting in metal oxide enamel colour(s). During the 17th century, the English added the letter j to their alphabet. Maiolica was commonly anglicized to majolica thereafter.

The second style of pottery known as majolica is the mid- to late-19th century Victorian style made by a simpler process (painting and then firing) whereby coloured lead silicate glazes were applied directly to an article resulting in brightly coloured, hard-wearing, inexpensive wares that were both useful and decorative, typically in naturalistic style. This type of majolica was introduced to the public at the 1851 Great Exhibition in London, later widely copied and mass-produced. Minton & Co., who developed the coloured lead glazes product, also developed and exhibited at the 1851 Exhibition a tin-glazed product in imitation of Italian maiolica which they called also majolica.

Terminology

The notes in this article append tin-glazed to the word meaning 'opaque white tin-glaze, painted in enamels', and coloured glazes to the word meaning 'coloured lead glazes, applied direct to the biscuit'.

Mintons' description
Leon Arnoux, the artistic and technical director of Mintons, wrote in 1852, "We understand by majolica a pottery formed of a calcareous clay gently fired, and covered with an opaque enamel composed of sand, lead, and tin...".

Arnoux was describing the Minton & Co. tin-glazed product made in imitation of Italian maiolica both in process and in styles. Tin-glaze is simply plain lead glaze with a little tin oxide added. His description is often referenced, in error, as a definition of Minton's other new product, the much copied and later mass-produced ceramic sensation of the Victorian era, Minton's coloured lead glazes, Palissy ware. The 16th-century French pottery of Bernard Palissy was well known and much admired. Mintons adopted the name 'Palissy ware' for their new coloured glazes product, but this soon became known also as majolica.

Minton Archive first design for majolica
Thomas Kirkby's design G144 in the Minton Archive is inscribed "This is the First Design for Majolica...". The design is Italian Renaissance in style. Close-up images illustrate a design suited for fine brushwork on flat surfaces. The design is for Minton's rare tin-glaze majolica imitation of Italian tin-glaze maiolica. Minton's designs for Palissy ware, also known as majolica, were suited for 'thick' painting of coloured lead glazes onto surfaces moulded in relief to make best use of the intaglio effect.

Coloured glazes earthenware

Earthenware coated with coloured lead glazes applied directly to an unglazed body has from the mid-19th century onwards been called majolica, e.g.: 20th-century majolica, Mexican majolica, Sarreguemines majolica, Palissy majolica, majolica-glazed Parian ware. The science involved in the development of multiple temperature compatible coloured lead glazes is complex, but the process itself is simple (paint, fire). This majolica is the vibrantly coloured, frequently naturalistic style of earthenware developed and named Palissy ware by Minton & Co. and introduced to the public at the 1851 Great Exhibition that was mass-produced throughout Europe and America and is widely available. In English this majolica is never spelt with an i in place of the j. It is, however, pronounced both with a hard j as in major and with a soft j as in maiolica. In some other languages i is indeed used for both coloured glazes earthenware and for tin-glazed earthenware: French  and Italian .

 
Biscuitware was painted with thick coloured lead glazes simultaneously, then fired. The process requires just two stages and skill in painting. When fired in the kiln, every colour fuses to the body, usually without running into each other. The ceramic technology, which transformed the fortunes of Mintons, was developed by art director Leon Arnoux.

Tin-glazed earthenware

Tin-glazed earthenware having an opaque white glaze with painted overglaze decoration of metal oxide enamel colour(s) is known as maiolica. It reached Italy by the mid-15th century. It is frequently prone to flaking and somewhat delicate. The word is also spelt with a j, majolica. In contemporary England the use of maiolica spelt with an i tends to be restricted to Renaissance Italian maiolica. In the US majolica spelt with a j is used for both coloured glazes majolica and tin-glazed. In France and other countries, tin-glazed maiolica developed also as faience, and in UK and Netherlands as delftware.

Ware dipped (or coated) in tin glaze, set aside to dry, brush-painted on the unfired glaze, then fired. Process requires four separate stages and high skill in painting.

Majolica types, detail
Examples showing detail of coloured glazes majolica (paint, fire) versus tin-glazed majolica (dip, dry, paint, fire).

Collectors of majolica
Famous collectors of majolica include William Randolph Hearst, Mortimer L. Schiff, Alfred Pringsheim, Robert Strauss, and Robert Lehman.

In contemporary fiction
 The Majolica Murders by Deborah Morgan

See also
 Lustreware
 Talavera de la Reina pottery
 Tin-glazing
 Victorian majolica

Citations

General and cited references 
 Arnoux, Leon, British Manufacturing Industries, Gutenberg, 1877.
 Atterbury, Paul, and Batkin, Maureen, Dictionary of Minton, Antique Collectors' Club, 1990.

External links

 The Majolica Society
 Potteries Museum and Art Gallery, Stoke-on-Trent, UK
 Victoria and Albert Museum, Majolica
 The Minton Archive "Magnificent Majolica" archive patterns for Minton tin-glazed majolica.

American pottery
Austrian pottery
Ceramic glazes
English pottery
French pottery
Pottery
Types of pottery decoration